Hathliolophia is a genus of beetle in the family Cerambycidae. Its only species is Hathliolophia alboplagiata. It was described by Stephan von Breuning in 1959.

References

Pteropliini
Beetles described in 1959